Sturbridge is a town in Worcester County, Massachusetts, United States. It is home to Old Sturbridge Village living history museum and other sites of historical interest such as Tantiusques.

The population was 9,867 at the 2020 census, with more than 3,600 households. For geographic and demographic information on specific parts of the town of Sturbridge, see: Fiskdale and Sturbridge (CDP).

History
Sturbridge was first visited by the English Puritans in 1644 when John Winthrop the Younger visited the area now known as Tantiusques. Winthrop II bought the land from Tantasqua (local area sachem) and mined graphite, lead, and iron. The mine stayed in the Winthrop family as late as 1784 and was in operation until 1910. Sturbridge was first settled by the English in 1729 by settlers from Medfield, and was officially incorporated in 1738. New Medfield and Dummer (after Governor William Dummer) were considered as town names before the town was named after Stourbridge, England.

Geography
Sturbridge is bordered by Charlton and Southbridge to the east, Union, Connecticut and Woodstock, Connecticut, to the south, Brimfield and Holland to the west, and Brookfield and East Brookfield to the north.

U.S. Route 20 runs through Sturbridge, and the junction of Interstate 90 (the Massachusetts Turnpike) and Interstate 84 is located there. The Wilbur Cross Highway (Connecticut Route 15) formerly ended in Sturbridge; locals sometimes call Haynes Street and portions of Mashapaug Road "Old Route 15". Haynes Street ends at Main Street (Massachusetts Route 131), which connects Sturbridge Center with Southbridge; on the west side of town, Massachusetts Route 148 connects Fiskdale with Brookfield. On August 18, 1955, gale-force winds and torrential downpour from Hurricane Diane created floodwaters that broke dams in surrounding towns and flooded the village.

Neighborhoods
The northwestern portion of the town, Fiskdale, is a census-designated place with its own post office and ZIP-code assignment.

Demographics

By the 2010 census, the population had reached 9,268.

As of the census of 2000, there had been 7,837 people, 3,066 households, and 2,213 families residing in the town. The racial makeup of the town was 97.14% White, 3.6% Black or African American, 2.7% Native American, 1.14% Asian, 0.09% Pacific Islander, 0.31% from other races, and 0.70% from two or more races. Hispanic or Latino of any race were 1.30% of the population.

There were 3,066 households, out of which 34.2% had children under the age of 18 living with them, 60.7% were married couples living together, 8.7% had a female householder with no husband present, and 27.8% were non-families. 23.4% of all households were made up of individuals, and 9.8% had someone living alone who was 65 years of age or older. The average household size was 2.55 and the average family size was 3.03.

In the town, the population was spread out, with 25.5% under the age of 18, 5.3% from 18 to 24, 29.5% from 25 to 44, 26.4% from 45 to 64, and 13.4% who were 65 years of age or older. The median age was 39 years. For every 100 females, there were 96.9 males. For every 100 females age 18 and over, there were 93.7 males.

The median income for a household in the town was $56,519, and the median income for a family was $64,455. Males had a median income of $50,168 versus $31,940 for females. The per capita income for the town was $25,559. About 4.5% of families and 6.1% of the population were below the poverty line, including 11.3% of those under age 18 and 8.3% of those age 65 or over.

Government

Arts and culture

Places of interest
Old Sturbridge Village, located on U.S. Route 20, is a living museum that re-creates life in rural New England from 1790s to the 1830s.

Tantiusques is an open-space reservation and historic site.

Wells State Park is a  woodland park and campground located on Route 49. The park includes  of trails and Walker Pond, which offers a setting for fishing, canoeing, and swimming.

Sturbridge is the home of the Sturbridge Worship Center church which impacts wider New England.

Education

Burgess Elementary School, serving grades K–6, is one of three public schools in Sturbridge. It has its own school committee, part of School Union 61. Sturbridge students also attend Tantasqua Regional Junior High School (grades 7–8) and Tantasqua Regional High School, in the Fiskdale section of town. Union 61 and the Tantasqua district share administrators, including the superintendent, and both include Brimfield, Brookfield, Holland, Sturbridge and Wales.

Library

The Sturbridge Public Library was established in 1873. In fiscal year 2008, the town of Sturbridge spent 1.51% ($332,136) of its budget on its public library, approximately $36 per person, per year ($47.44 adjusted for inflation to 2022).

Notable people
 Katharine Johnson Jackson (1841-1921), physician

See also
 Leadmine Wildlife Management Area

References

External links

 
 Sturbridge official website

 
Towns in Worcester County, Massachusetts
Populated places established in 1729
Towns in Massachusetts
1729 establishments in Massachusetts